The range of area codes 600-699 is reserved AT Baja California, Baja California Sur, Chihuahua, Durango, Sinaloa and Sonora.

(For other areas, see Area codes in Mexico by code).

6